A Choice Selection of Strawbs is a compilation album of songs by Strawbs.

Track listing
Source: StawbsWeb

Personnel
Dave Cousins – lead vocals, backing vocals, guitar, dulcimer (all tracks)
Tony Hooper – backing vocals, guitar (tracks 6,7,10,12)
Dave Lambert – lead vocals, backing vocals, guitar (tracks 1,2,3,4,8,9,11,13,14,15,16)
John Ford – lead vocals, backing vocals, bass guitar, acoustic guitar (tracks 1,3,5,6,7,10,12,13,15,16)
Chas Cronk – backing vocals, bass guitar (tracks 2,4,8,9,11,14)
Richard Hudson – backing vocals, drums, percussion, sitar (tracks 1,3,5,6,7,10,12,13,15,16)
Rod Coombes – drums (tracks 2,4,8,9,11,14)
Rick Wakeman – keyboards (tracks 5,6,12)
Blue Weaver – keyboards (tracks 1,3,7,10,13,15,16)
John Hawken – keyboards (tracks 2,4,8,11)
Robert Kirby – keyboards (track 9)
John Mealing – keyboards (track 9)

Release history

References

1992 compilation albums
Strawbs compilation albums
A&M Records compilation albums